USS Consolation (AH-15) was a  originally in service with the United States Navy from 1945 to 1955. In 1960 she was chartered to the People to People Health Foundation and renamed  and served for another 14 years until being scrapped in 1975.

Consolation was built as Marine Walrus in 1944 by Sun Shipbuilding and Dry Dock Co., Chester, Pennsylvania.  Sponsored by Mrs. H. C. Wilson; acquired by the Navy 30 August 1944; converted at Bethlehem Steel Co., Hoboken, New Jersey; and commissioned 22 May 1945.

With a bed capacity of 802 and a complement of 564, Consolation joined the Pacific Fleet to provide hospital services, consultation, preventive medicine and casualty evacuation.  Arriving on station in the Pacific after Victory over Japan Day, Consolation was assigned to establish a shore screening station and field hospital to screen Allied POWs at Wakayama, Honshū.  She transferred 1,062 POWs to Okinawa and returned to serve as the base hospital for Honshū and then Nagoya, Japan during the Allied occupation of Japan.  Consolation returned to San Francisco to undergo a brief overhaul from 23 November 1945 until 6 December 1945. From March until October 1946 she served as a transport from the canal zone to New York.  From October 1946 she remained in commission, although inactive, until the outbreak of the Korean War.

Departing Norfolk 14 July 1950, Consolation arrived at Korea 16 August to care for the wounded until 6 April 1954.  During this conflict she was the first hospital ship outfitted with a helicopter landing pad,  in length, during 1951. In August she participated in Operation "Passage to Freedom" to return French troops from Vietnam to France, then returning to Korea until March 1955.  She was decommissioned on 30 December 1955.

Consolation received 10 battle stars for Korean war service.

On 16 March 1960 Consolation was chartered to the People to People Health Foundation and renamed SS Hope, an acronym for Health Opportunity for People Everywhere.  She sailed in September 1960 on her first cruise to Indonesia bringing modern medical treatment and training to that country. Later cruises to underdeveloped areas of the world included South Vietnam, Peru, Ecuador, Guinea, Nicaragua, Colombia, Sri Lanka, Tunisia, Jamaica, and Brazil.

Hope was retired in 1974 after eleven voyages.

References
 
 
 

 

1944 ships
Haven-class hospital ships
Ships built by the Sun Shipbuilding & Drydock Company
World War II auxiliary ships of the United States
Korean War auxiliary ships of the United States